Sergiu Cosmin Bar (born 19 March 1980) is a Romanian former footballer who played as a centre back for teams such as UM Timișoara, Metalul Plopeni, Petrolul Ploiești, Victoria Brănești, Săgeata Năvodari and Singen 04, among others.

Honours
UM Timișoara
Divizia C: Winner (1) 1998–99

Victoria Brănești
Liga III: Winner (1) 2008–09
Liga II: Winner (1) 2009–10

External links
 
 
 Sergiu Bar at fupa.net

1980 births
Living people
Sportspeople from Timișoara
Romanian footballers
Association football defenders
Liga I players
Liga II players
FC Politehnica Timișoara players
CSP UM Timișoara players
CSO Plopeni players
FC Petrolul Ploiești players
CS Brănești players
CS Inter Gaz București players
CSU Voința Sibiu players
AFC Săgeata Năvodari players
CS Afumați players
Romanian expatriate footballers
Romanian expatriate sportspeople in Germany
Expatriate footballers in Germany